Te Papapa railway station is on the Onehunga Branch section of the Onehunga Line, one of the lines of the Auckland railway network in New Zealand. It has a side platform layout and is reached from Mays Rd.

The Onehunga Branch line was opened in December 1873, and a station was first opened at Te Papapa in April 1877. The branch line was closed in 1973 and reopened 37 years later with the ceremonial opening of Onehunga Line services on 18 September 2010.

Te Papapa station was reopened on 18 September 2010 and fare-paying services began again on 19 September 2010..

Service
Bus services 670 and 743 serve Te Papapa when they pass close by.

See also
 Onehunga Branch
 Public transport in Auckland
 Transport in Auckland
 List of Auckland railway stations

References

Railway stations in New Zealand
Rail transport in Auckland